Riaz Hassan (born 7 November 2002) is an Afghan cricketer. He made his international debut for the Afghanistan cricket team in January 2022.

He made his first-class debut for Amo Region in the 2018 Ahmad Shah Abdali 4-day Tournament on 8 April 2018. He made his List A debut for Amo Region in the 2018 Ghazi Amanullah Khan Regional One Day Tournament on 18 July 2018. He made his Twenty20 debut on 8 September 2020, for Kabul Eagles in the 2020 Shpageeza Cricket League.

In January 2022, he was named in Afghanistan's One Day International (ODI) squad for their series against the Netherlands in Qatar. He made his ODI debut on 25 January 2022, for Afghanistan against the Netherlands.

References

External links
 

2002 births
Living people
Afghan cricketers
Afghanistan One Day International cricketers
Amo Sharks cricketers
Kabul Eagles cricketers
Cricketers from Nangarhar Province